Leonard Wood Hall (October 2, 1900 – June 2, 1979) was an American lawyer and politician who served seven terms as a United States representative from New York from 1939 to 1952.

Early life and education 

Hall was the son of Franklyn Herbert and Mary Anne (née Garvin) Hall. He was born at Sagamore Hill, the manor house of future President Theodore Roosevelt, near Oyster Bay, New York. Franklyn Hall was Roosevelt's coachman and White House librarian.

Hall attended public schools and graduated from the law department of Georgetown University in 1920. He was admitted to the bar in 1922 and commenced practice in New York City.

Family 
He married Gladys Dowsey, the daughter of local Republican political leader, on May 10, 1934, in Oyster Bay. She had two children from a previous marriage.

Political career 
He was a member of the New York State Assembly (Nassau Co., 2nd D.) in 1927 and 1928; Sheriff of Nassau County from 1929 to 1931; and again a member of the State Assembly in 1934, 1935, 1936, 1937 and 1938. He was a delegate to the 1948, 1952, 1956 and 1968 Republican National Conventions.

Congress 
Hall was elected as a Republican to the 76th, 77th, 78th, 79th, 80th, 81st and 82nd United States Congresses, holding office from January 3, 1939, to December 31, 1952, when he resigned to take office as Surrogate of Nassau County. He resigned that office to become Chairman of the Republican National Committee, serving from 1953 to 1957.

Later career 
He was President Dwight D. Eisenhower's personal representative at opening of the Brussels World's Fair in April 1958, and resumed the practice of law in Garden City and New York City as senior partner in the firm of Hall Casey Dickler & Brady. Later that year he was a candidate for the Republican nomination for Governor of New York, but withdrew in favor of Nelson Rockefeller, who went on to defeat incumbent W. Averell Harriman in the general election.

In 1964, after Republican presidential nominee Barry M. Goldwater of Arizona named his friend of nearly three decades, Denison Kitchel, as the national campaign manager, a group of party establishment donors urged Goldwater to replace the inexperienced Kitchel with Hall, but Goldwater stood behind his initial choice.

Death 
Hall resided in Locust Valley and in 1979 died in Glen Cove. Interment was in Memorial Cemetery of St. John's Church (Episcopal), Laurel Hollow. Buried along with Hall in Memorial Cemetery are a number of other American celebrities, government officials, and political figures of the 20th century, including Henry L. Stimson, William S. Paley, and Arthur Dove.

References

External links

The Political Graveyard
Records of the Office of the Chairman of the Republican National Committee (Leonard W. Hall), Dwight D. Eisenhower Presidential Library
 

|-

|-

|-

|-

1900 births
1979 deaths
20th-century American politicians
20th-century American judges
Georgetown University Law Center alumni
Republican Party members of the New York State Assembly
New York (state) state court judges
Republican National Committee chairs
People from Locust Valley, New York
People from Oyster Bay (town), New York
Republican Party members of the United States House of Representatives from New York (state)